Henderson Bay High School is a public alternative high school in Gig Harbor, Washington, United States. It is part of the Peninsula School District and located on the same campus as Gig Harbor High School.

References

External links 
 

Alternative schools in the United States
High schools in Pierce County, Washington